Spilosoma clava is a species of moth of the family Erebidae. It was described by Alfred Ernest Wileman in 1910. It is found in Taiwan.

Description

Female

Head white tinged with buff; palpi crimson at base, black at tips; frons at sides and antennae black; thorax brown buff, the patagia with black spots; pectus dark brown in front; crimson streaks below the wings; the fore coxae and femora above crimson, the tibiae and tarsi black above; abdomen crimson, the base, tip of anal tuft and ventral surface buff, a dorsal series of black bands except at base, lateral series of spots and sublateral spots on medial segments. Pore wing buff suffused with brown except at base; a black fascia on basal third of costa; a black fascia on middle of inner margin with ante- and postmedial black spots above it above vein 1; a small spot at upper angle of cell and elongate spot above it on costa; an oblique series of black points from apex to below vein 0, then an oblique brownish line to the postmedial spot above vein 1; subterminal black points above veins 1 and 3. Hindwing pale buff, the inner area slightly tinged with purplish crimson; a black discoidal spot and subterminal spots at discal told, below vein 2 and above and below vein 1. Underside of forewing with the basal half and costal area tc towards apex suffused with crimson.

Wingspan 58 mm.

References

Moths described in 1910
clava